Guy II de Balliol (died early 1160s x 1167) was probably the second-eldest son of Bernard I de Balliol, Lord of Balliol and Barnard Castle. As his older brother Enguerrand predeceased their father, Guy succeeded when his father died sometime between 1154 and 1162. He died sometime on or before 1167, and was succeeded by his youngest brother Bernard II de Balliol.

Notes

References
 Stell, G. P., "Balliol, Bernard de (d. 1154x62)", Oxford Dictionary of National Biography, Oxford University Press, 2004 , accessed 24 Jan 2008
 Stell, G. P., "Balliol, Bernard de (d. c.1190)", Oxford Dictionary of National Biography, Oxford University Press, 2004 , accessed 24 Jan 2008

1160s deaths
Anglo-Normans
People from Barnard Castle
People from Yorkshire
Guy II
People from Somme (department)
Year of birth unknown
12th-century English people